Der Ruf may refer to:
 Der Ruf, the German title of a 1949 German drama, known in English as The Last Illusion.
 Der Ruf, a World War II era POW newspaper, known in English as The Call.